Schwäbisch Hall station is located in Schwäbisch Hall in the German state of Baden-Württemberg. It lies on the Crailsheim–Heilbronn railway (Hohenlohebahn) and is classified by Deutsche Bahn as a category 6 station.

Location

Schwäbisch Hall Station is located just to the south-west of Hall's old town at the top of the drop from an old southwestern meander of the Kocher river (Bahnhofsbucht, meaning "station bay") to the lower slope of the modern river and is about 30 metres above the river level. The terrain was partly filled to a quite high level for the construction of railway facilities. The station stands on a terrace with steep slope to Steinbacher Straße, which runs parallel with it.

History

Schwäbisch Hall station is located on the Crailsheim–Heilbronn railway, originally called the Kocherbahn ("Kocher Railway", referring to the Kocher river). The line was built at the request of the population and followed its approval by the Württemberg Chamber of Deputies in 1860. The Heilbronn–Schwäbisch Hall section was opened in 1862 and extended to Crailsheim in December 1867. The station originally had three platforms, which were connected by crossings over the tracks, a freight yard, a signal box, which was demolished in 1968, and several sidings.

Loss of significance of the Murr Railway

About 10 years after the construction of Schwäbisch Hall station, the building of the Waiblingen–Schwäbisch Hall railway (Murr Valley Railway) connected Stuttgart with Crailsheim and provided a shorter route to Nuremberg than the line through Aalen. The Murr Valley Railway ended at a junction with the Crailsheim–Heilbronn railway on a ridge on the eastern side of the Kocher valley gorge in Hessental, which at that time had not yet been incorporated in Hall; this route avoided Schwäbisch Hall station, which is on the valley slopes. This meant that the town station, despite its more central location, became less significant than the Hessental station.

Damage in World War II and the postwar period 

A Second World War air raid on 23 February 1945 destroyed the three-storey station building, killing eight people. After the Second World War, it was initially rebuilt in a temporary form. The new station building was opened in 1955. Queen Elizabeth II visited on a special train on 24 May 1965.

Today the station has only one platform as the siding had been removed by 1988.  The platform was modernised in 2013. In addition, the station building, which had been long closed, was used for three months from the summer of 2013 for an exhibition entitled Soziale Plastik Stadtbahnhof21 ("Social sculpture town station 21") at the Kunstvereins Gleis 1 ("art society platform 1"), which was also exhibited at Waldenburg station temporarily. Paintings, sculptures, objects and installations were presented relating to railways, transport and mobility. Its initiator, Hans Graef, hoped this would lead to the revival of the station "in anticipation of the Stadtbahn" (referring to a proposal to extend the Heilbronn Stadtbahn).

References

Railway stations in Germany opened in 1862
Buildings and structures in Schwäbisch Hall (district)
Railway stations in Baden-Württemberg
19th-century establishments in Württemberg
Schwäbisch Hall